Ringo Starr and His All-Starr Band is Ringo Starr's first official live album, and the first album recorded with his All-Starr Band, recorded in 1989 during his successful comeback tour and released in 1990. It was also Starr's first release of unheard material in seven years.

Overview 
After taking a hiatus from his solo career following 1983's Old Wave, Starr spent the next few years making TV appearances and guesting on other artists' recordings and gigs, as well as recording an album that would remain unissued. In 1988, however, he and wife Barbara Bach accepted that they both were suffering from alcoholism and took steps to rehabilitate themselves. Once Starr was sober, he felt the need to work again. Before delving into an album, he wanted to hit the road – but with a difference. Always one to include friends, Starr formed the All-Starr Band, an ever-changing live line-up of musicians that would back Starr up, in addition to each performing a song or two themselves.

Booking himself on the road from July to September 1989, Starr was accompanied by  Dr. John, Joe Walsh, Billy Preston, the Band's Levon Helm and Rick Danko, Nils Lofgren, Clarence Clemons, and session drummer Jim Keltner. The shows were often sold out and were well received. The performance contained here was recorded on the closing nights of the US tour at the Greek Theatre in Los Angeles.

Release
Ringo Starr and His All-Starr Band was released through EMI on 8 October 1990 (Starr's first association with his first label since 1975). In the US however, Rykodisc assumed the distribution of the album, releasing it on 12 October 1990. Failing to chart, the release would be deleted some years later.

The song "It Don't Come Easy" was released as a single from the album, backed with "The Weight" and two non-album tracks "Rocky Mountain Way" (sung by Joe Walsh) and "Act Naturally" (sung by Ringo).

A limited edition deluxe version of the album that included a bonus CD single was released only in the US.

Another song from the same performances as the album, "With a Little Help from My Friends", was released on the compilation album Nobody's Child: Romanian Angel Appeal.

Track listing

Personnel 
Ringo Starr and His All-Starr Band
Ringo Starr – drums, vocals
Joe Walsh – guitars, percussion, vocals
Nils Lofgren – guitars, accordion, vocals
Billy Preston – keyboards, vocals
Dr. John – piano, vocals
Garth Hudson – accordion
Rick Danko – bass guitar, vocals
Levon Helm – drums, harmonica, percussion, vocals
Jim Keltner – drums, percussion
Zak Starkey – drums
Clarence Clemons – saxophone, percussion, vocals

References
 Footnotes

 Citations

External links
 http://www.ringostarr.com
 JPGR's Ringo Starr and His All-Starr Band site

Albums produced by Joe Walsh
1990 live albums
Ringo Starr live albums
Rykodisc live albums
Albums recorded at the Greek Theatre (Los Angeles)
Ringo Starr & His All-Starr Band